In  mathematics, more specifically sheaf theory, a branch of topology and algebraic geometry, the exceptional inverse image functor is the fourth and most sophisticated in a series of image functors for sheaves. It is needed to express Verdier duality in its most general form.

Definition

Let f: X → Y be a continuous map of topological spaces or a morphism of schemes. Then the exceptional inverse image is a functor
Rf!: D(Y) → D(X)
where D(–) denotes the derived category of sheaves of abelian groups or modules over a fixed ring.

It is defined to be the right adjoint of the total derived functor Rf! of the direct image with compact support. Its existence follows from certain properties of Rf! and general theorems about existence of adjoint functors, as does the unicity.

The notation Rf! is an abuse of notation insofar as there is in general no functor f! whose derived functor would be Rf!.

Examples and properties
If f: X → Y is an immersion of a locally closed subspace, then it is possible to define

f!(F) := f∗ G,

where G is the subsheaf of F of which the sections on some open subset U of Y are the sections s ∈ F(U) whose support is contained in X. The functor f! is left exact, and the above Rf!, whose existence is guaranteed by abstract nonsense, is indeed the derived functor of this f!. Moreover f! is right adjoint to f!, too.
 
Slightly more generally, a similar statement holds for any quasi-finite morphism such as an étale morphism.
If f is an open immersion, the exceptional inverse image equals the usual inverse image.

Duality of the exceptional inverse image functor
Let  be a smooth manifold of dimension  and let  be the unique map which maps everything to one point. For a ring , one finds that  is the shifted -orientation sheaf.

On the other hand, let  be a smooth -variety of dimension .

Then  where  denotes the Tate twist.

 
the above computation furnishes the -adic Poincaré duality
 
from the repeated application of the adjunction condition.

References
  treats the topological setting
  treats the case of étale sheaves on schemes. See Exposé XVIII, section 3.
  gives the duality statements.

Sheaf theory